Subarnapur may refer to:

Subarnapur district in the state of Orissa, India
Sonepur, headquarters of Subarnapur district
Subarnapur, Nepal
Subarnapur, Nadia, a census town in West Bengal, India